The 2017 season is Manchester City Women's Football Club's 29th season of competitive football and its fourth season in the FA Women's Super League and at the top level of English women's football, having been promoted from the FA Women's Premier League before the 2014 season.

Following a reorganisation of top-level women's football in England, the 2017 season will only cover half of a traditional season's length, with the league season only running to nine games total, while the FA WSL shifts its calendar to match the traditional autumn-to-spring axis of football in Europe. For the same reason, there is no Champions League qualification nor relegation to be competed for.

Non-competitive

Pre-season

Friendly

Competitions

Women's Super League

League table

Results summary

Results by matchday

Matches

FA Cup

Champions League 

Campaign continued from the previous season

Quarter-finals

Semi-finals

Squad information

Playing statistics

Appearances (Apps.) numbers are for appearances in competitive games only including sub appearances
Red card numbers denote:   Numbers in parentheses represent red cards overturned for wrongful dismissal.

Goalscorers
Includes all competitive matches. The list is sorted alphabetically by surname when total goals are equal.

Correct as of 25 May 2017

Transfers and loans

Transfers in

Transfers out

References

2017